Slastyonka is a rural locality (a selo) in Shchuchinsko-Peskovskoye Rural Settlement, Ertilsky District, Voronezh Oblast, Russia. The population was 82 as of 2010. There are 2 streets.

Geography 
Slastyonka is located on the Ertil River, 25 km west of Ertil (the district's administrative centre) by road. Stary Ertil is the nearest rural locality.

References 

Rural localities in Ertilsky District